J Majik (born Jamie Spratling, Northwood, England) is a drum and bass DJ and producer. He has been active since his early teens in the early 1990s.

Biography
He released his first track in 1992 (as DJ Dextrous) on the Planet Earth record label. By 1994, he had changed his stage name to the current moniker (because there was already another DJ Dextrous within the scene with a following) recording with Suburban Base Records, and was releasing tracks on the Metalheadz label. Since then Majik has released tracks on the Mo' Wax label, and now runs his own label, Infrared. He also makes music under the names Innervisions and Infrared.

Collaborations with
Goldie
Adam F
Danny J
DJ Hype
Hatiras
Kathy Brown
Liquid People
Sonic & Silver
Wickaman
Junglist BassPrey
DJ Ugallu

Discography

Selected albums
FabricLive.13
Red Alert 2005
Crazy World 2008

Singles
"Your Sound" (1995)
"Jim Kutta" (1995)
"Arabian Nights" (1996)
"Love Is Not a Game" (featuring Kathy Brown) (2000) - UK #34
"The Lizard" (2000)
"Solarize" (2001)
"Metrosound" (with Adam F) (2002) - UK #54
"24 Hours" (2002)
"Spaced Invader" (2001) on Defected Records
"Scooby Doo" / "Spycatcher" (with Wickaman) (2004) - UK #67
"Crazy World" (with Wickaman) (2008)
"In Pieces" (with Wickaman featuring Dee Freer) (2011)

Remixes
 2003: Adam F - Where's My...?
 2005: Breakfastaz - Midnight (With Wickaman)
 2008: Deadmau5 & Kaskade - I Remember (With Wickaman)
 2008: Goldie - Shining Down (With Goldie)
 2010: The Qemists featuring Maxsta - Renegade (With Wickaman)
 2010: Cutline - Die for You (With Wickaman)

Infrared Records releases

References

External links
Infrared
 

People from Northwood, London
DJs from London
Year of birth missing (living people)
Living people
English electronic musicians
English DJs
English drum and bass musicians
Electronic dance music DJs